Abagrotis anchocelioides (blueberry budworm moth) is a moth of the family Noctuidae. It is found from southern Quebec to North Carolina, west to southern Manitoba, North Dakota and Missouri.

The wingspan is 32–38 mm. Adults are on wing from June to September.

The larvae are thought to feed on fruit buds of blueberry, although other sources list the food plants as unknown.

External links
Bug Guide
The Noctuinae (Lepidoptera: Noctuidae) of Great Smoky Mountains National Park, U.S.A.

Abagrotis
Moths of North America
Moths described in 1852